The 2008 Saint John River flood was considered the worst flooding of the Saint John River in 35 years. Flood levels reached 27 feet and 4 inches in Fredericton on May 1, almost reaching the previous record of 28 feet and 3 inches, set in 1973. Flooding was attributed to the melting of record snowfall from the 2007-2008 winter and heavy rain during the melting season. Fifty streets in Fredericton area were closed as a result of the flooding. The flooding caused severe damage in areas of northern Maine and western New Brunswick including international bridges and hundreds of homes and buildings.

By May 3, the Canadian Red Cross had registered 680 residents who had been forced to evacuate from their homes. An additional 600 residences were evacuated in Maine.

See also
1973 Saint John River Flood

References

External links
 City of Fredericton
 City of Fredericton 2008 River Watch Information

Natural disasters in New Brunswick
Floods in Canada
Saint John River Flood
Saint John River Flood
Edmundston
Fredericton
Fort Kent, Maine
Natural disasters in Maine
Madawaska, Maine
2008 in Maine
2008 in New Brunswick
April 2008 events in North America
May 2008 events in North America
April 2008 events in Canada
May 2008 events in Canada
April 2008 events in the United States
May 2008 events in the United States
2008 floods in North America